List of student nations at Lund University in Sweden. The tradition of nations at the university is practically as old as the university itself.

The list is always sorted in accordance with a time-honoured order based on the age of the diocese of the area that the nation was named after. The reason for this was that almost all students earlier came from gymnasiums, and these were only found in diocesan capitals.

Active nations 

12 of the 13 nations (Smålands Nation being the exception) have established a cooperation, including being members of the Academic Society (Akademiska Föreningen).

Former nations 
Skånska Nationen (circa 1674–1889) Originally, all Scanian people enrolled in Skånska nationen. However, due to growth of the University the nation was dissolved in 1890 into five parts: Lunds Nation, Malmö Nation, Helsingkrona Nation, Ystad Nation (later Sydskånska Nationen) and Kristianstad Nation. 
Götiska Nationen (a merge of the nations of Östgöta, Västgöta and Kalmar 1766–1798, and then by the nations of Västgöta and Kalmar 1798–1817. After 1871, only Västgöta Nation used the name)
Norrlands Nation (circa 1803–1842)
Södermanlands Nation (1838–1847)

See also
Nations at Swedish universities

References 

 
Lund University